The Cracow Klezmer Band was a Polish jazz quartet formed by accordionist and composer  in 1997 in the city of Kraków, and recorded for Tzadik Records. The group performed at Jewish Culture festivals in Hungary, Finland, Poland, Prague, and the Czech Republic. Its sound was different from what most people would consider to be traditional klezmer music — instead of danceable versions of traditional Yiddish songs, and free-form fantasies, and laments, The Cracow Klezmer Band played often dark and brooding but soulful and dynamic original virtuoso compositions instead in the klezmer form.  Some songs could be considered dance pieces, but there were none of the traditional Bulgars, Freylekhs or Horas.

They also imitated non-musical sounds using their instruments, for example the sound of a creaking ship or a distant crying bird; this actually has a long tradition in klezmer music.

In January 2007, the band changed its name to the Bester Quartet, with the same line-up.

Members 
The Cracow Klezmer Band consisted of four members:
 Jarosław Bester – accordion
 Jarosław Tyrala – violin
 Oleg Dyyak – accordion, clarinet and percussion
 Wojciech Front – double bass

Discography
The Band released albums on John Zorn's Tzadik record label, with its mandate of "Radical Jewish Culture."

The Cracow Klezmer Band 

 De Profundis (2000)
 The Warriors (2001)
 Voices in the Wilderness (2003) - Crakow Klezmer Band perform one track
 Bereshit (2003)
 Sanatorium Under the Sign of the Hourglass (2005)
 Balan: Book of Angels Volume 5 (2006)
 Remembrance (2007)

Bester Quartet 

 Metamorphoses (2012)
 The Golden Land (2013)
 Krakoff (2013)

See also
 Culture of Kraków

References

External links
 
 Bester Quartet's Homepage
 Album reviews in All About Jazz

Musical groups established in 1997
Klezmer groups
Polish musical groups
Polish jazz ensembles
Tzadik Records artists
1997 establishments in Poland